Carlos Daniel López Huesca (born 12 June 1990), commonly known as Carlitos, is a Spanish professional footballer who plays for Polish club Legia Warsaw as a forward.

Having played no higher than Segunda División B in his own country, he spent most of his career abroad, with spells in Russia, Cyprus, Poland, the United Arab Emirates and Greece. He was the top scorer of the 2017–18 Ekstraklasa with 24 goals for Wisła Kraków.

Club career

Early years
Carlitos was born in Alicante, Valencian Community. He played youth football for a number of clubs, and made his debut as a senior in Tercera División, with Torrellano Illice CF.

Carlitos spent the 2011–12 season with neighbouring Ontinyent CF, in Segunda División B. In the summer of 2012 he moved abroad, going on to make his first appearances as a professional with FC Petrotrest Saint Petersburg in the National League of Russia.

In January 2015, as he was top scorer with fourth-tier side Novelda CF, Carlitos joined Aris Limassol FC in the Cypriot Second Division. In the summer, after helping to promotion, he returned to his country and signed for CD Eldense.

Wisła Kraków
On 22 June 2017, Carlitos left Villarreal CF B and moved to Polish club Wisła Kraków. In his first season in the Ekstraklasa, he won the Player of the Season as well as the Striker of the Season awards after finishing top scorer with 24 goals in 36 matches. This tally included a brace in a 2–1 home win in the local derby against KS Cracovia on 12 August, a hat-trick on 9 March 2018 against Śląsk Wrocław and a penalty nine days later in a 2–0 victory at Legia Warsaw; this was his team's first in the city in eight years.

Legia Warsaw
In the summer of 2018, Carlitos was linked with a move away from cash-strapped Wisła to Lech Poznań, before joining Legia on 5 July. He made his debut nine days later in the Super Cup, coming on as a 57th-minute substitute for Miroslav Radović in a 3–2 home defeat to Arka Gdynia. On 17 July he played the first European game of his career, coming off the bench to conclude a 3–0 win (4–0 aggregate) over Cork City in the first qualifying round of the UEFA Champions League. 

Carlitos was the league season's joint third top scorer with 16 for the runners-up. This included two on 21 October in a 3–3 draw when his former team visited the Stadion Wojska Polskiego.

Panathinaikos
On 9 September 2019, Carlitos joined the UAE Pro League's Al Wahda FC for €1.8 million. On 28 January 2020, he signed a three-and-a-half-year contract with Panathinaikos F.C. for an undisclosed fee. His first Super League Greece goal came in a 2–2 away draw against OFI Crete F.C. on 18 October. The following weekend, he missed a penalty seconds before scoring through a header in the 1–1 home draw to Volos FC. 

Carlitos scored a hat-trick on 16 October 2021 in a 4–1 home win over Ionikos FC, becoming the first player since Marcus Berg in 2017 to achieve this feat for the club.

Return to Legia
On 16 August 2022, after again being linked with their archrivals Lech Poznań, Carlitos returned to Legia Warsaw on a two-year deal.

Personal life
Carlitos' younger brother, Rubén, is also a footballer. He too played in Kraków, but for Wisła's rivals Cracovia.

Career statistics

Honours
Legia Warszawa
Ekstraklasa: 2019–20

Panathinaikos
Greek Cup: 2021–22

Individual
Ekstraklasa Player of the Year: 2017–18
Ekstraklasa Forward  of the Year: 2017–18
Ekstraklasa Top goalscorer: 2017–18 (24 goals)

References

External links

1990 births
Living people
Spanish footballers
Footballers from Alicante
Association football forwards
Segunda División B players
Tercera División players
Ontinyent CF players
CF Fuenlabrada footballers
Novelda CF players
CD Eldense footballers
Villarreal CF B players
Russian First League players
FC Petrotrest players
Cypriot Second Division players
Aris Limassol FC players
Ekstraklasa players
Wisła Kraków players
Legia Warsaw players
UAE Pro League players
Al Wahda FC players
Super League Greece players
Panathinaikos F.C. players
Spanish expatriate footballers
Expatriate footballers in Russia
Expatriate footballers in Cyprus
Expatriate footballers in Poland
Expatriate footballers in the United Arab Emirates
Expatriate footballers in Greece
Spanish expatriate sportspeople in Russia
Spanish expatriate sportspeople in Cyprus
Spanish expatriate sportspeople in Poland
Spanish expatriate sportspeople in the United Arab Emirates
Spanish expatriate sportspeople in Greece